Ascoseira is a monotypic genus of seaweed in the brown algae (class Phaeophyceae). The  single and type species, Ascoseira mirabilis Skottsberg, is a large parenchymatous macroalgae, and is endemic to the Antarctic Ocean. Ascoseira is assigned to its own order. The alga grows in subtidal waters at depths of from 3 to 15 meters.

References

External links
 Ascoseira at Algaebase

Brown algae
Monotypic brown algae genera